Ján Krivák (born 10 November 1993) is a Slovak footballer who plays as centre-back for Košice of 2. Liga.

Career

FO ŽP Šport Podbrezová
Krivák made his professional debut for ŽP Šport Podbrezová against Senica on 27 February 2016.

FC Košice
In June 2022, Krivák signed with Košice citing closeness to his hometown and family, following his release from Shkëndija Tetovo after 2.5 years with the club.

International career
Krivák was called up for two unofficial friendly fixtures held in Abu Dhabi, UAE, in January 2017, against Uganda (1–3 loss) and Sweden. He made his debut against Sweden, being fielded in the 46th minute, when he substituted Dominik Kružliak. Slovakia went on to lose the game 0–6.

Private life
Krivák originates from Vranov nad Topľou and lives in Košice.

References

External links
 FO ŽP Šport Podbrezová official club profile 
 
 Futbalnet Profile 

1993 births
Living people
People from Vranov nad Topľou
Sportspeople from the Prešov Region
Slovak footballers
Slovak expatriate footballers
Association football defenders
MFK Vranov nad Topľou players
ŠK Odeva Lipany players
FK Železiarne Podbrezová players
MFK Karviná players
KF Shkëndija players
FC Košice (2018) players
5. Liga players
3. Liga (Slovakia) players
Slovak Super Liga players
Czech First League players
2. Liga (Slovakia) players
Macedonian First Football League players
Expatriate footballers in the Czech Republic
Slovak expatriate sportspeople in the Czech Republic
Expatriate footballers in North Macedonia
Slovak expatriate sportspeople in North Macedonia